was a Japanese freestyle wrestler who won a world title in 1954 and an Olympics gold medal in 1956. He was the flag bearer for Japan at the 1956 Games. During his career Sasahara won approximately 200 bouts.  After retiring from competitions he worked as a national coach. His trainees included Osamu Watanabe.

Sasahara is credited with having designed "bound tennis" in 1980, which is a form of tennis played on a small-sized court. In 1981 he became the founding president of the Japan Bound Tennis Association. Between 1989 and 2003 Sasahara was president of Japan Wrestling Association. For many years he also served as Vice-President of United World Wrestling (FILA), and was later named its Honorary Vice-president. In 2006 he was inducted to the FILA International Wrestling Hall of Fame.

Sasahara died on March 5, 2023, at the age of 93.

Books by Sasahara

References

1929 births
2023 deaths
Olympic wrestlers of Japan
Wrestlers at the 1956 Summer Olympics
Japanese male sport wrestlers
Olympic gold medalists for Japan
Olympic medalists in wrestling
People from Yamagata Prefecture
World Wrestling Champions
Medalists at the 1956 Summer Olympics
Presidents of the Japan Wrestling Federation